Dance Dance Dance is a German competitive dancing talent show that air on RTL.

Scoring chart

Red numbers indicate the lowest score for each week
Green numbers indicate the highest score for each week
 the couple eliminated that week
 the winning couple
 the runner-up couple
 the third-place couple

Weekly scores

Week 1

References

2016 German television series debuts
RTL (German TV channel) original programming
German reality television series
Dance competition television shows
German-language television shows